Berdiya is a rural locality (a settlement) in Kondrashovskoye Rural Settlement, Ilovlinsky District, Volgograd Oblast, Russia. The population was 180 as of 2010. There are 4 streets.

Geography 
Berdiya is located 34 km northeast of Ilovlya (the district's administrative centre) by road. Chernozubovka is the nearest rural locality.

References 

Rural localities in Ilovlinsky District